William Duncan State School (WDSS) is a state school located on the Gold Coast, Queensland, Australia. The school was opened in 1987 with just 186 students enrolled. As of 2022 there are approximately 603 students enrolled.

History 
With a large increase in population of the Nerang area in the 1980s, the Nerang State School, Nerang's only primary school at the time, was nearing capacity. The Queensland Department of Education decided to open the William Duncan State School in Nerang in 1987. The William Duncan State School was named after William Duncan, one of the first white men to set foot in the area of Nerang in 1842.

Current day 
The school has created a new motto aside their other one, "A United School of Excellence". They have also developed a new initiative called the "Centre of Musical Excellence" (CME) (established in 2014). This program is especially for musically orientated students. There are special CME classes for those students. They have a great learning system with a recently built building (completed in late 2011) including a kitchen, science lab, new library, computer lab, toilet, and meeting rooms.

In the news 
This school has a policy of exclusion.  It is reported in the media that children who do not attend school due to reasons including legitimate illness are excluded from special reward days.

This school has a policy of bullying with it being reported that children have been reprimanded for hugging outside the school grounds.

This school has a policy of harassment with children banned from rolling up their sleeves.

Facilities 
In this school there are 2 senior girl and boy toilet blocks, 1 junior girl and boy toilet block, a teachers library, student library, science room, kitchen, junior oval, senior oval, junior playground (2), senior playground and multi-purpose courts. Every classroom has an interactive white board. In many of the ICT lessons they have the use an iPad to help them research things for their lessons. They are also taught some essential keys to learning and researching.

References 

Public high schools in Queensland
Schools on the Gold Coast, Queensland
Educational institutions established in 1987
1987 establishments in Australia